Goodlad is a surname. Notable people with the surname include:

Alastair Goodlad, Baron Goodlad, KCMG, PC, (born 1943), British Conservative politician, British High Commissioner to Australia 2000–2005
Elaine Goodlad (born 1964), professional figure competitor and makeup artist
John Goodlad (1920–2014), North American educational researcher and theorist
Mark Goodlad (born 1979), former professional footballer who played as a goalkeeper
William Goodlad, 17th-century whaler and admiral of the Muscovy Company

See also
Goodlad's stinkfish (Callionymus goodladi), a species of ray-finned fish in the genus Callionymus